People's Democracy Party may refer to:
 People's Democracy Party (Indonesia)
 People's Democracy Party (Nigeria)
 People's Democracy Party (South Korea)
 People's Democracy Party (Turkey)
 People's Democracy Party (Vietnam)